Black Marble is an American music project led by Chris Stewart.

Black marble may also refer to:

 Ashford Black Marble, a name given to dark limestone quarried from mines near Ashford-in-the-Water, England
 Black Marble (company), a Microsoft software development company in Britain
 The Black Marble, a 1980 film directed by Harold Becker
 The Blue Marble#Black Marble 2012, an image of Earth
 black-colored marble, a rare coloration of the stone